Dua Mangi is a Karachi woman who was abducted on November 30, 2019, outside a restaurant in Defense House Authority. She was safely returned home one week later.

Background 
Dua Mangi is a law student, who studied in both the United States and in Karachi. She is the niece of the Sindhi poet and columnist Aijaz Mangi, who is outspoken about feminism, politics, and human rights and deeply critical of atrocities in society.

Abduction 
Mangi and her friend Haris Soomro were out in the evening getting food from a restaurant on November 30 around 8 pm. While walking back a car with at least four men pulled up alongside them and threatened them with a gun. Other sources have stated that there were five men in the vehicle, with only one using a mask. When Soomro attempted to fight back and protect Mangi he was shot by at least one of the men in the neck and the bullet traveled into his chest. The car used by the abductors was stolen from the area the previous week.

Release 
She was reportedly returned home safely by officials December 7, 2019.

Investigation 
The Karachi Police have released a statement in which they believe the abduction occurred because Mangi had met a man in the United States and had been pressuring her to marry him and had threatened her. According to Mangi's father she had a fight with a man shortly before her abduction. At least twenty-two witnesses, mostly of family and friends, spoke with investigators shortly after the abduction.

As Mangi's phone fell onto the road, it was being used to help investigate the abduction. Officials used CCTV footage to attempt to identify the attackers, and have impounded the car they believe to be a part of the crime.

Response 
News of her abduction was posted on social media by family and friends, creating a heated debate over victim blaming and whether the perpetrators were actually justified over abducting her due to her actions online and her clothing. With the family's influence in civil society and media, a protest was staged at the city's Teen Talwar roundabout.

See also
List of kidnappings
List of solved missing person cases

References 

2010s missing person cases
Formerly missing people
Kidnapped people
Kidnappings in Pakistan
Missing person cases in Pakistan
November 2019 crimes in Asia
History of women in Pakistan